Ivan Ivanov (born 9 May 1960) is a Soviet former racing cyclist. In the 1989 Vuelta a España, he finished sixth overall and won one stage. He came in eighth place overall the following year and won another stage in 1991. He also rode in the 1990 Tour de France, but did not finish the race.

References

External links

1960 births
Living people
Soviet male cyclists
Place of birth missing (living people)